Sweet and Soulful Sounds is an album by American jazz pianist Bobby Timmons recorded in 1962 and released on the Riverside label.

Reception
The AllMusic review by Stewart Mason awarded the album 4 stars stating: "Sweet and Soulful Sounds, from 1962, is a most atypical record for Bobby Timmons. Long thought of only as a funky piano player in the style that Ramsey Lewis would later make commercially successful, Timmons could also play prettily, as he does on this ballad-heavy set... This is an unusual record for Bobby Timmons, but a great one".

Track listing
All compositions by Bobby Timmons except as indicated
 "The Sweetest Sounds" (Richard Rodgers) – 4:56 
 "Turn Left" – 5:26 
 "God Bless the Child" (Arthur Herzog, Jr. Billie Holiday) – 5:01 
 "You'd Be So Nice to Come Home To" (Cole Porter) – 4:35 
 "Another Live One" – 4:10 
 "Alone Together" (Howard Dietz, Arthur Schwartz) – 5:59 
 "Spring Can Really Hang You up the Most" (Fran Landesman, Tommy Wolf) – 3:38 
 "Why Was I Born?" (Oscar Hammerstein II, Jerome Kern) – 5:49 
Recorded at Plaza Sound Studio in New York City by Ray Fowler on June 18, 1962 (tracks 3, 4 & 7) and June 19, 1962 (tracks 1, 2, 5, 6 & 8).

Personnel
Bobby Timmons – piano   
Sam Jones – bass 
Roy McCurdy – drums

References

Riverside Records albums
Bobby Timmons albums
1962 albums
Albums produced by Orrin Keepnews